Trond Torleivsson Benkestok (c. 1495 – 14 February 1558) was a Norwegian land owner, knight and feudal lord (lensherre) of Bergenhus Fortress.

Biography
Benkestok was born around 1495 (or before 1500) in Bergen to nobleman Torleiv Trondson Benkestok and Adelus Eriksdotter Kruckow. In 1532, he actively supported Johan Kruckow, who wanted Frederick I rather than King Christian II on the Norwegian throne. In July 1532, Christian II was captured and imprisoned. As Frederick I won the struggle, Benkestok was awarded the title of squire (væpner). He was probably a supporter of Roman Catholicism until the last Catholic archbishop Olav Engelbrektsson fled Norway in 1537.

Among other places, he owned much land in Nordland at Meløy (Meløy – gård) which he had as his main farm from no later than 1540. In 1541 he received taxes from Meløy chapel and from Sunnfjord len. He was awarded Sunnmøre len, the land of Stigten in 1547, and around the same time he was also promoted to knight.

In 1555 he took charge of Bergenhus Fortress and in the years 1555-56 he was commander-in-chief during the absence of commander Christoffer Huitfeldt (c. 1500–1559). Claus Bille once described Benkestok as the "most respected and wise nobleman North of the mountains".

Benkestok was married to Anna Jonsdotter Haar (ca. 1510 - 1567), with whom he had sons Tord and Jon Trondson Benkestok and daughters Adelus, Kristin and Brynild. He died in Vanse, Norway, 14 February 1558.

See also
Benkestok (noble family)

References

Other sources
Brandt, Wilhelmine (original edition: 1904, facsimile ed: 1997) Slægten Benkestok (Oslo: Damms Antikvariat AS) 

1495 births
1558 deaths
16th-century Norwegian nobility
T
Norwegian knights
Norwegian squires